Raúl Isaac González San Vicente (born 2 December 1955) is a Chilean former footballer.

Career
González played for clubs in both Chile and South Africa. In Chile, he played for Santiago Wanderers and Palestino. In South Africa, he played for Moroka Swallows, Bush Bucks and AmaZulu between 1984 and 1987. His last club was Moroka Swallows in 1987.

At international level, he represented Chile U20 in the 1975 South American Championship. At senior level, he played in four matches for the Chile national team in 1979. He was also part of Chile's squad for the 1979 Copa América tournament, where Chile was the runner-up.

In 1999, he worked as the assistant coach of Mario Tuane, who promoted his signing with Moroka Swallows in 1983, in the South African club African Wanderers.

Personal life
He is the father of both the former Chile international footballer Mark González and the actor and football agent Raúl Hoffmann.

Honours
Santiago Wanderers
 Segunda División de Chile (1): 1978

Moroka Swallows
 Mainstay Cup (1): 1983

Bush Bucks
 National Soccer League (1): 1985

Chile
  (1):

References

External links
 Raúl González at MemoriaWanderers 
 

1955 births
Living people
Sportspeople from Valparaíso
Chilean footballers
Chilean expatriate footballers
Chile international footballers
Chile under-20 international footballers
Santiago Wanderers footballers
Club Deportivo Palestino footballers
Moroka Swallows F.C. players
Bush Bucks F.C. players
AmaZulu F.C. players
Chilean Primera División players
Primera B de Chile players
Chilean expatriate sportspeople in South Africa
Expatriate soccer players in South Africa
Association football defenders
Chilean football managers
Chilean expatriate football managers
Expatriate soccer managers in South Africa